The Riveter is a for-profit company headquartered in Seattle, Washington. It is focused on supporting women in the workplace. It engages in political advocacy, provides office and work space, hosts events, and publishes content. It was named after Rosie the Riveter, a symbol for women in the workplace during World War II. 

The Riveter was founded in July 2017 in Seattle by former attorney Amy Nelson and former social worker Kim Peltola, who later left the company, using $700,000 in initial funding. In 2018, it raised $4.75 million in seed funding and $15 million in Series A funding. In mid-2019, The Riveter acquired a Denver coworking space business called Women in Kind. The Riveter expanded to 9 locations by late 2019. 

The Riveter's gathering and work spaces are mostly made up of offices and large public rooms filled with desks. The locations may also provide fitness events, workshops, and other services. The Riveter's membership is about 75 percent female and 25 percent male.

References

External links
 Official website
 Bloomberg Interview with CEO

Organizations based in Seattle
Organizations established in 2017
2017 establishments in Washington (state)
Feminist organizations in the United States
Women's political advocacy groups in the United States
History of women in Washington (state)